List of works by Henry Payne Details of some of the major works of the stained glass artist Henry Payne.

Payne worked for a period as a student of Christopher Whall and in turn, when teaching at the Birmingham School of Art, included A.J. Davies, Florence Camm, and Margaret Agnes Rope amongst his pupils.

Works

Birmingham Museums and Art Gallery

The Birmingham Art Gallery Birmingham, Warwickshire have a Payne window which came from a Methodist chapel in Cradley Heath.  It was executed in 1922 and served as a War Memorial for the men of the chapel's congregation who gave their lives in the First World War. The work was entitled "Peace and Goodwill". In Payne's composition angels appear to the shepherds to announce the Birth of Jesus. The title is part of the words "Glory to God in the highest, and on earth peace, good will toward men". There are three vignettes at the base of the window which depict the Annunciation, the Nativity and the Crucifixion. The window was designed and made by Payne at his studio in the Cotswolds.

The Birmingham Museum and Art Gallery has another window which shows Payne's prowess as a designer. It is called "Rumour" and dates to 1908.  It was made by a pupil of Payne's under his supervision and was Payne's own design. The subject is "History" protected by a cloak of vigilance (the artist has used eyes to show this), threatened by deceipt and false witness.  The telegraph poles in the background indicate the speed with which "rumour" can fly, and remind us that technology can be used for good and evil purposes. The subject reflected the concern at the time about the independence and responsibility of the mass media.

St James
St James church in Chipping Campden, Gloucestershire featured in "England’s Thousand Best Churches" by Simon Jenkins.
Payne completed the five-light East window in 1925 in memory of those who served in the Great War. 15th Century glass was used in the tracery.

The window is inscribed-

In the first light we have depictions of St James, St George with sword and shield, St James leaving his boat to follow Jesus and the Fereby Arms.  In light two we have angels who look towards Christ in the next light to their right, St Catherine with her wheel, Moses holding up his hands and a depiction of the parish church.  In the third light Payne depicts Christ, the Madonna and Child, a shepherd with his flock and the Arms of Canterbury.  The fourth light depicts more angels, again looking towards Christ on the left, St John the Baptist, Elijah with horses and the Chariot of Fire and the Arms of Grevel House.  The fifth light depicts St Martin and the beggar at Amiens, St Michael the Archangel weighing the souls of men and the Arms of the See of Gloucester. The inclusion of St Martin reminds us that the Armistice had been signed on St Martin's Day.

List of works
The following list is a partial list of Payne's works.

References

Payne